Justin Möbius (born 21 April 1997) is a German professional footballer who plays as a midfielder.

Club career
Möbius came through the academy system at VfL Wolfsburg Academy. He called up the second team in 2016. He made his professional debut in the Regionalliga Nord on 30 July 2016 against ETSV Weiche. On 26 October 2015, he made his debut for first team in DFB-Pokal against 1. FC Heidenheim. He played 60 minutes of the game,  after he replaced Bruno Henrique.

In July 2020, Möbius joined SC Preußen Münster, newly relegated to the Regionalliga West, on a free transfer from Karlsruher SC.

References

External links
 

1997 births
Living people
Footballers from Berlin
German footballers
Germany youth international footballers
Association football midfielders
VfL Wolfsburg II players
VfL Wolfsburg players
Karlsruher SC players
Berliner FC Dynamo players
SC Preußen Münster players
Bundesliga players
Regionalliga players
3. Liga players